Michael Wong (born 1978), better known by his stage name Mike Relm, is an American disc jockey, turntablist, director, and VJ from San Francisco, California.

Biography
He has performed with notable hip-hop artists The Pharcyde, Lyrics Born, Money Mark, Gift of Gab, Del tha Funkee Homosapien, Mike Patton, and D-Sharp.  In 1999 he won the International Turntablist Federation's USA competition.  More recently he toured as part of Mike Patton's Peeping Tom project.  As a solo artist, Relm is known for live performances which feature a series of audio mashups paired with video images, manipulated in real-time with turntables and Serato DJ Pro.

Mike Relm toured with Blue Man Group from 2007 to 2008 and Tony Hawk in 2008.  He performed at the 2007 Coachella Valley Music and Arts Festival and Bonnaroo, as well as the Audiotistic-Future Sound Festival which featured Outkast and Mos Def.  In 2005 he released a DVD called Suit Yourself, which documents his time on the "Fourth Dimensional Rocketships" tour with Gift of Gab. He most recently opened for Diggnation Live at the House of Blues in San Diego, California.

In 2008, he released "Everytime" featuring Del The Funky Homosapien; producing the song as well as directing the music video.

In addition to producing music, he has been hired to direct music videos, commercials, and short films. He directed the Jabbawockeez in their first music video "Devastating Stereo", as well as Funeral Party in "New York City Moves to the Sound of LA" and "Just Because".

In 2010 he launched his Relmvision channel on YouTube where he features remixes of films, commercials, viral videos, and television shows in which he re-edits visual elements over music he composes. His unique style helped him gain over 120,000 subscribers in under 12 months, and his videos views are in the millions. Notable remixes include Iron Man 2, Old Spice, Scott Pilgrim Vs. The World, Doctor Who, and Harry Potter. His Punisher/Spirit/Transporter remix won the 2009 Webby Award for Best Mashup/Remix.

In 2014, Relm was listed on New Media Rockstars Top 100 Channels, ranked at #79.

In 2015, he became The Pharcyde's tour DJ/VJ.

In 2019, Relm produced and performed the opening for the Fortnite World Cup at the Arthur Ashe Stadium in New York.

Remix Discography

 Iron Man 2 (TV Spot)
 Back to the Future (TV Spot)
 The Cornetto Trilogy
 Baby Driver
 Amy Schumer
 Child's Play
 Parasite
 Avengers Endgame
 Shazam!
 Swoozie's 99 Princess Problems
 Joker
 It
 Home Alone
 Wonder Woman
 Deadpool
 The Jungle Book
 Star Wars
 The Walking Dead
 Vsauce
 Everly
 Godzilla
 Get Out
 MIB International
 Cowboys & Aliens
 Harry Potter
 Scott Pilgrim vs. the World
 The Devil's Double
 0000
 Happy Endings
 Philip DeFranco
 Aziz Ansari
 Burlesque
 S'leb Suit
 Key of Awesome
 Smosh 2010
 MysteryGuitarMan
 Limitless
 Smosh 2011
 Texas Chainsaw 3D
 ShaneDawsonTV
 Smosh 2012
 Smosh 2013
 Smosh 2014
 Smosh 2015
 Smosh 2016

Discography 

 Radio Fryer (self-released, 2005)
 Spectacle (Radiofried Records, 2008)

Battle Records 

 Leave it to Beaver (BEAVER001-VINYL, STA Records, 1999)
 Jugglin' Jaws (JAWZ001-VINYL, Thud Rumble, 2001)
 Aaahs: Session 1 (WIZ-002, Wizard Records, 2003)
 The Zodyax Scop System

Videos/Films Featuring Mike Relm 

 Scratch (Palm, 2000)
 Along Came Polly (Universal, 2004)
 Suit Yourself (self-released, 2006)
 Clown Alley: Relm's first film experience.
 Blue Man Group: How to Be a Megastar Live! (Blue Man Group/Rhino, 2008)

Albums/Compilations Featuring Mike Relm 

 Awaken (Electromatrix, 2000)

Other Artistic Credits 

 Skratchcon 2000 (documentary film, Director, Co-Editor; 2000)

References

External links
Official Site
TinyMixTapes review of Spectacle

American musicians of Asian descent
1978 births
Living people